Filip Koperski (born 24 February 2004) is a Polish professional footballer who plays as a midfielder for Lechia Gdańsk.

Biography

Early years

Koperski's footballing journey started in 2011 when he joined the APLG footballing academy in Gdańsk. After two years with the APLG academy, Koperski made a series of moves joining different footballing academies, starting with a move to the Polish capital, Warsaw, joining Escola Varsovia Warsaw for two years. After his time in Warsaw Koperski moved to Barcelona, Spain, joining U.B. Catalònia, with whom he spent a season, and Unió Esportiva Sants for two seasons. After three years in Spain Koperski returned to Gdańsk joining Lechia Gdańsk. On 7 October 2020 Koperski made his debut for the Lechia Gdańsk II team in the Regional Polish Cup against Orzeł Subkowy. Towards the end of 2020 Koperski was invited to train with the Lechia Gdańsk first team, impressing manager Piotr Stokowiec.

Career
On 8 January 2021 Koperski signed his first professional contract, signing a deal with Lechia Gdańsk until 30 June 2023, and chose the number 72, which he stated was dedicated to his father.

References

2004 births
Living people
Sportspeople from Gdańsk
Sportspeople from Pomeranian Voivodeship
Polish footballers
Poland youth international footballers
Association football midfielders
Lechia Gdańsk II players
Lechia Gdańsk players
Ekstraklasa players
IV liga players
Polish expatriate footballers
Expatriate footballers in Spain
Polish expatriate sportspeople in Spain